The Oat Hills are a low mountain range in San Diego County, California.

The Oat Hills are to the west of the Laguna Mountains.

References 

Peninsular Ranges
Mountain ranges of San Diego County, California